Metlatónoc  is one of the 81 municipalities of Guerrero, in south-western Mexico. The municipal seat lies at Metlatónoc. The municipality covers an area of 1367.8 km².

As of 2005, the municipality had a total population of 17,398.

The municipality has one of the most distinctive shapes in Mexico, that of a horseshoe.

References

Municipalities of Guerrero